Tachina subcinerea is a species of fly in the genus Tachina of the family Tachinidae that can be found in India and Nepal.

References

Insects described in 1853
Diptera of Asia
subcinerea